James Blake and Jack Sock were the defending champions, but Blake did not participate was due to his retirement from professional tennis.  Sock played alongside Ryan Harrison, but lost to Bob and Mike Bryan in the semifinals.
The Bryan brothers went on to win the title, defeating František Čermák and Mikhail Elgin in the final, 6–2, 6–3.

Seeds

Draw

Draw

External links
 Main draw

Delray Beach International Tennis Championships - Doubles
2014 Doubles
2014 Delray Beach International Tennis Championships